Alexandra Schiffer, married name Alexandra Christl (born 1982) is a German actress and art historian.

Life and career
Schiffer is the daughter of Michaela May and Jack Schiffer and older sister of Lilian Schiffer. She studied art history in London. She is married to the investment banker Thomas Christl, has three children and works for Sotheby’s in London as a specialist in impressionism and modern art.

Filmography 
 1993: Zwei Halbe sind noch lange kein Ganzes
 1994: Unsere Schule ist die Beste
 1995: Hallo, Onkel Doc!
 1996: Der Bulle von Tölz: Tod am Altar
 1996: Männer sind was Wunderbares
 1998: Der Bergdoktor
 1998: Hallo, Onkel Doc!
 1998: Ärzte
 1998: Papa, ich hol’ dich raus
 1999: Unser Lehrer Doktor Specht
 1999: Am Anfang war der Seitensprung
 2001/2002: 
 2003/2006: SOKO München
 2007: Der Komödienstadel: Alles fest im Griff
 2010: Eine Sennerin zum Verlieben

References

External links 
 

1982 births
Living people
Actresses from Munich
German art historians
German film actresses
German television actresses
Audiobook narrators
Sotheby's people
20th-century German actresses
20th-century German historians
21st-century German actresses
21st-century German historians
Women art historians